Sutthisak Singkhon (born 5 October 1996) is a Thai decathlete. He competed at the 2017 World Championships dropping out after four events. Earlier that year, he won the gold medal at the 2017 Asian Championships, where he set a national record. He won a silver medal at the 2018 Asian Games.

International competitions

Personal bests

Outdoor
100 metres – 10.85 (+1.5 m/s, Jakarta 2018)
400 metres – 48.05 (Bangkok 2017)
1500 metres – 4:45.18 (Bhubaneswar 2017)
110 metres hurdles – 14.80 (0.0 m/s, Bhubaneswar 2017)
High jump – 2.00 (Jakarta 2018)
Pole vault – 4.30 (Kuala Lumpur 2017)
Long jump – 7.83 (Bangkok 2017)
Shot put – 14.09 (Bhubaneswar 2017)
Discus throw – 44.42 (Jakarta 2018)
Javelin throw – 60.64 (Bhubaneswar 2017)
Decathlon – 7809 (Jakarta 2018)

Indoor
60 metres – 7.05 (Ashgabat 2017)
1000 metres – 3:07.82 (Ashgabat 2017)
60 metres hurdles – 8.49 (Ashgabat 2017)
High jump – 1.91 (Ashgabat 2017)
Pole vault – 4.20 (Ashgabat 2017)
Long jump – 7.32 (Ashgabat 2017)
Shot put – 14.00 (Ashgabat 2017)
Heptathlon – 5332 (Ashgabat 2017)

References

1996 births
Living people
Sutthisak Singkhon
Sutthisak Singkhon
Sutthisak Singkhon
Southeast Asian Games medalists in athletics
Sutthisak Singkhon
Sutthisak Singkhon
Athletes (track and field) at the 2018 Asian Games
Asian Games medalists in athletics (track and field)
Medalists at the 2018 Asian Games
Competitors at the 2017 Southeast Asian Games
Competitors at the 2019 Southeast Asian Games
Sutthisak Singkhon
Universiade medalists in athletics (track and field)
Universiade bronze medalists for Thailand
Medalists at the 2019 Summer Universiade
Sutthisak Singkhon